Min Hla Htut (also known as Saw Min Phyu (စောမင်းဖြူ); b. 1388/89) was a princess of Ava. She was the only daughter of King Tarabya of Ava and Queen Min Hla Myat of Ava and sister of King Min Nyo of Ava.

Hla Htut was the first wife of her half cousin Prince Thihathu of Ava. They were married by King Minkhaung I. Her marriage to Thihathu, who was six years her junior, did not last. In 1415, Thihathu divorced her before marrying his then widowed sister-in-law Saw Min Hla. King Minkhaung then married Hla Htut to Saw Shwe Khet, her half cousin, twice removed. They had a daughter named Shin Yun, who later became wife of Gov. Min Maha of Prome.

Ancestry
Hla Htut was a granddaughter of King Swa Saw Ke of Ava, and ultimately descended from the Pagan royalty.

Notes

References

Bibliography
 
 
 

Ava dynasty